The 1872 Vermont gubernatorial election took place on September 3, 1872. Incumbent Republican John W. Stewart, per the "Mountain Rule", did not run for re-election to a second term as Governor of Vermont. Republican candidate Julius Converse defeated Liberal Republican and Democratic nominee Abraham B. Gardner to succeed him.

Results

References

Vermont
1872
Gubernatorial
September 1872 events